Sea butterflies, scientific name Thecosomata (thecosomes, "case / shell-body"), are a taxonomic suborder of small pelagic swimming sea snails. They are holoplanktonic opisthobranch gastropod mollusks. Most Thecosomata have some form of calcified shell, although it is often very light and / or transparent.

The sea butterflies include some of the world's most abundant gastropod species,
and because of their large numbers are an essential part of the food chain, and a significant contributor to the oceanic carbon cycle.

The sea butterflies are included in the Pteropoda order, and are also included in the informal group Opisthobranchia.

Morphology
Sea butterflies float and swim freely in the water, and are carried along with the currents. This has led to a number of adaptations in their bodies. The shell and the gill have disappeared in several families. Their gastropodal foot has taken the form of two wing-like lobes, or parapodia, which propel the animal through the sea by slow flapping movements.

Most Thecosomata have some form of calcified shell, although often very light.
They are rather difficult to see, since their shell (if present) is mostly transparent, very fragile, and usually tiny: Less than 1 cm in length. Although their shell may be so fine as to be transparent, it is nevertheless calcareous, and an important part of the ocean calcite cycle.
Their shells are bilaterally symmetric and can vary widely in shape: coiled, needle-like, triangular, or globular.

The shell is present in all stages of the Cavolinioidea (euthecosomata) life cycle. In the Cymbulioidea (pseudothecosomata), adult Peraclididae also bear shells; the Cymbuliidae shed their larval shells and develop a cartilaginous pseudoconch in adulthood; only the Desmopteridaen lack any rigid covering as adults.

Behaviour and distribution 
Sea butterflies range from the tropics to the poles.
They are "holoplanktonic": That is, they spend their whole lives floating among the plankton, rather than just being planktonic during their larval stage. As such, the thecosomata are the most common (in terms of diversity, species richness, and abundance) in the top  of the ocean, and become rarer the deeper one samples.

Sometimes, they swarm in large numbers and can be found washed up in flotsam, especially along the coast of eastern Australia.

Diurnal vertical migration 
Thecosomata beat their wing-like parapodia to "fly" through the water.
When descending to deeper water, they hold their wings up.

They migrate vertically from day to night, so the community structure changes on a 24 hour cycle; during the day many organisms take refuge at water depths in excess of 100 m.

Feeding
Little is known about the behaviour of sea butterflies, but they are known to have a peculiar way of feeding.

They are generally herbivorous, mostly passive plankton feeders, just floating along with the currents, ventral-side up, although some may become active feeders at times.
They catch planktonic food by entangling it in a mucous web that can be up to 5 cm wide – many times larger than themselves. If disturbed, they abandon the net and flap slowly away.

Every day, they migrate vertically in the water column, following their planktonic prey. At night they graze at the ocean surface and return to deeper water in the morning.

Fossil record 
This is, geologically speaking, a rather young group, having evolved from the Late Paleocene in the Cenozoic Era.

The group is represented in the fossil record from shells of those groups within the clade that mineralized.
These carbonate shells are a major contributor to the oceanic carbon cycle, making up as much as 12% of global carbonate flux. However the low stability of their aragonitic shells means that few end up being preserved in sediments as fossils, mostly being deposited in shallow waters of tropical seas.

Importance in the food chain
These creatures, which range from lentil- to orange-sized, are eaten by various marine species, including a wide variety of fish that are, in turn, consumed by penguins and polar bears. The sea butterflies form the sole food source of their relatives, the Gymnosomata. They are also consumed by sea birds, whales, and commercially important fish. However, if sea butterflies are consumed in large quantities fish can get "black gut", which makes them unsellable.

Taxonomy
Along with its sister group, the sea angels (Gymnosomata), the sea butterflies (Thecosomata) are included in the order Pteropoda.
The validity of the pteropod order is not universally accepted; it fell out of favour for a number of years, but recent molecular evidence suggests that the taxon should be revived. 
Although most Thecosomata have some form of calcified shell, mature Gymnosomata have none.

Ponder & Lindberg 
Order Thecosomata de Blainville, 1824
 Infraorder Euthecosomata
 Superfamily Limacinoidea
 Family Limacinidae de Blainville, 1823
 Superfamily Cavolinioidea
 Family Cavoliniidae H. and A. Adams, 1854
 Family Clioidae
 Family Creseidae
 Family Cuvierinidae
 Family Praecuvierinidae
 Infraorder Pseudothecosomata
 Superfamily Peraclidoidea
 Family Peraclidae Tesch, 1913
 Superfamily Cymbulioidea
 Family Cymbuliidae Gray, 1840
 Family Desmopteridae Dall, 1921

Bouchet & Rocroi 
In the new taxonomy of Bouchet & Rocroi (2005) Thecosomata is treated differently :

Clade Thecosomata : 
Superfamily Cavolinioidea  Gray, 1850  ( = Euthecosomata)
Family Cavoliniidae  Gray, 1850 (1815) 
Subfamily Cavoliinae   Gray, 1850 (1815)  (formerly Hyalaeidae  Rafinesque, 1815 )
Subfamily Clioinae  Jeffreys, 1869  (formerly Cleodoridae  Gray, 1840  - nomen oblitum)
Subfamily Cuvierininae  van der Spoel, 1967  (formerly : Cuvieriidae  Gray, 1840  (nom. inv.); Tripteridae  Gray, 1850 )
Subfamily Creseinae Curry, 1982 
Family Limacinidae  Gray, 1840  (formerly : Spirialidae  Chenu, 1859 ; Spiratellidae  Dall, 1921 )
 † Family Sphaerocinidae  A. Janssen & Maxwell, 1995 
Superfamily Cymbulioidea  Gray, 1840  ( = Pseudothecosomata)
Family Cymbuliidae  Gray, 1840 
Subfamily Cymbuliinae  Gray, 1840 
Subfamily Glebinae  van der Spoel, 1976 
Family Desmopteridae  Chun, 1889 
Family Peraclidae  Tesch, 1913  (formerly Procymbuliidae  Tesch, 1913 

Bouchet & Rocroi (2005) move the family Limacinidae into the superfamily Cavolinioidea, making redundant the superfamily Limacinoidea erected for it in Ponder & Lindberg's taxonomy. The families Creseidae and Cuvierinidae are demoted to subfamilies of Cavoliniidae (Creseinae and Cuvierininae). The infraorder Pseudothecosomata becomes the superfamily Cymbulioidea. The family Peraclididae is included in the superfamily Cymbulioidea as the family Peraclidae, making the superfamily Peraclidoidea redundant.

See also
 Ocean acidification
 Clione antarctica

Footnotes

References

Sources
 

 

 

 

 

Euopisthobranchia
Extant Thanetian first appearances